Beka Economopoulos (born 1974) is an American artist and director of the art, activism, technology, and theory non-profit "Not An Alternative". She is a co-founder and director of a traveling pop-up museum, The Natural History Museum, as well as an organizer of the March for Science.

Personal life 
Economopoulos was educated at Holton-Arms School and Northwestern University. She is married to Jason Jones. They have one child, and they live in Vashon, Washington.

Career
An environmental justice activist since about 1993, Economopoulos was a co-founder of The Natural History Museum in 2014, a traveling museum and museum transformation project highlighting sociopolitical forces that shape nature, which The New York Times and ArtNet named "Best in Art in 2015". She is a founding member of Not An Alternative, a social justice arts collective, and she was a co-organizer and Board Member of the March for Science in 2017. She is a sustainability advocate, and has been Director of Online Organizing at Greenpeace and the Director of Strategy at Fission Strategy. In those positions she worked with the Global Climate Change Alliance and the United Nations Foundation.

Economopoulos and The Natural History museum have mobilized protests of museums with connections to petroleum interests and climate change deniers, urging museums to cut ties with them.

Selected publications

Awards
In 2018, Economopoulos became one of twenty Roddenberry fellows in the inaugural year of the fellowship, designated to support, "leaders and disrupters whose work is making our country more inclusive and equitable for all".

References

External links
 
 Beka Economopoulos, Vice President, Fission Strategy (video, 6:02)
 Art of the MOOC: Activism and social movements (video, 16:29)
 Mentor Interview: Beka Economopoulos/Not An Alternative and Estrella Payton (video, 3:45)
 Museum Hive w/ Beka Economopolis: Museums and Environmental Action (video, 54:05)

Living people
Year of birth uncertain
21st-century American women artists
Artists from Brooklyn
Northwestern University alumni
American environmentalists
American women environmentalists
1974 births